Kimberly Mason (born 19 September 1989 in Manly, Sydney, New South Wales, Australia) is an Australian rhythmic gymnast. She started rhythmic gymnastics in 1996 at Presbyterian Ladies' College, Sydney, in New South Wales, under the head coach Nicole Higham.

Mason has had consistently strong performances in international competitions. In the 2005 Australian Championships, she was second, continuing to be selected for the Australian World Championships team. At the 2005 World Championships in Baku, Azerbaijan, she competed in only three out of four apparatus but was ranked 64th overall, while the next Australian, Naazmi Johnston, was ranked in 94th. In the 2006 Melbourne Commonwealth Games, Mason earned two individual medals (2nd ball, 3rd clubs) and a team medal.

References

External links
 
 
 
 

1989 births
Living people
Australian rhythmic gymnasts
Sportswomen from New South Wales
Gymnasts at the 2006 Commonwealth Games
Sportspeople from Sydney
Commonwealth Games silver medallists for Australia
Commonwealth Games bronze medallists for Australia
Commonwealth Games medallists in gymnastics
People from Manly, New South Wales
People educated at the Presbyterian Ladies' College, Sydney
Medallists at the 2006 Commonwealth Games